Carallia brachiata is a large tree in the family Rhizophoraceae, that grows to a height of  and found from Australia, Malesia, Indochina through to the Western Ghats. It is the host plant of the moth Dysphania percota in India and Dysphania numana in Australia.

Gallery

References

brachiata